The Astounding Wolf-Man is a comic book series launched by American company Image Comics on May 5, 2007. It ran until its final 25th issue in 2010. A spin-off of Robert Kirkman's Invincible, the series was created and written by Kirkman with art by Jason Howard. The first issue of The Astounding Wolf-Man was given away for free as part of Free Comic Book Day. A "director's cut" edition of the first issue was released in the same date as the second issue.

The story is that of Gary Hampton, a CEO who is mauled by a werewolf while on a family vacation. The story revolves around Gary's efforts to use his powers for good and to be a superhero, despite being plagued by a curse.

Conclusion
Robert Kirkman ended The Astounding Wolf-Man in 2010 with the story arc "Legacy". Although Wolf-Man's own series was concluded and all loose ends tied up, Kirkman pointed out that characters from Wolf-Man's universe would still crossover into his other characters' lives as they inhabit the same universe; Wolf-Man himself appeared in the Invincible series several times, notably in a two-part storyline (Invincible Universe #8–9) sent as part of an extraction squad consisting of Popper, Mantis, Best Tiger, and Claire Voyant to capture a Brazilian super-criminal known as Redeye. Wolf-Man is momentarily distracted by the presence of Davi, Redeye's ward, and captured. Weakened due to his injuries and lack of moonlight, Wolf-Man seems to confuse Davi with Chloe. Davi aids Wolf-Man's escape as Best Tiger destroys Redeye's prison. As the prisoners and townspeople, left bloodthirsty following Redeye's depowerment, Wolf-Man, still weak, is unable to stop the riot and becomes separated from Davi. Fearing he has again failed to save a child, Wolf-Man returns to the base unaware that Davi has escaped harm and now possesses Redeye's powers.

Characters
 Gary Hampton aka "Wolf-Man" – the main protagonist of the series; a successful businessman-turned werewolf superhero following an incident that left him with werewolf abilities.
 Rebecca Hampton – Gary's beautiful wife. Killed in Issue #7 by Zechariah; who she struck across the face after expressing her disdain for him; Zechariah, momentarily blinded by rage, responded by hitting her across the face, breaking her neck, and then fatally biting her neck, causing Rebecca to bleed to death.
 Chloe Hampton aka "Vampire Girl" – Gary's loving daughter, she is close to both of her parents.
 Dunford – The estate manager, butler and lifelong friend to the Hampton family; formerly a businessman whose company was bought out by Gary during his rise in the business world, Dunford was actually offered a position in Hampton Industries, but chose to retire instead. Following his wife's death, Dunford, who was friends with Gary by then, was invited to stay with his family as their estate manager. Dunford is Gary's closest friend and sees him as a kind and generous man who has only ever wanted to help people; a belief that leads to him to be the (initially) only one who believes Gary's innocence following Rebecca's death. Dunford is made Chloe's legal guardian during this time, and ultimately is successful in getting her through her grief. Killed in Issue #22 by Jacobsen and the werewolves following their attack on the Hampton estate. Gary, Chloe, Mecha-Maid and Elise attend his private funeral.
 Maria – The loyal maid to the Hampton family; reluctantly let go following Gary's loss of his company, which forced the family to cut back on luxuries.
 Nathan Singleton – A corporate CEO and head of Singleton Enterprises; Hampton Industries' greatest rival. Singleton himself was a rival of Gary for years, later embarked upon an affair with a lonely Rebecca – and gained information from her about Gary's company that almost ruined him. Singleton, despite appearing to have taken advantage of his relationship with Rebecca in order to hurt Gary's business, was actually in love with Rebecca, and, even after the two ended their relationship, he was still happy to get back together when Rebecca distanced herself from Gary, during his early days as Wolf-Man, and reached back out to Singleton. Singleton was last seen attending Rebecca's funeral, alongside Chloe, Dunford and Gary and Rebecca's parents.
 Zechariah – A vampire who approached Gary immediately following his discovery of his abilities; Zechariah posed as a friend and mentor to Gary in his early days as Wolf-Man; teaching him all he knew about werewolves and how to control his abilities, as well as establishing his Wolf-Man identity. Ultimately, Gary's trust in Zechariah crumbled when he realized how much Zechariah was keeping from him – when Zechariah tried to find and reconcile with Gary; instead he met Rebecca, and a confrontation led him to kill Gary's wife in a brief moment of rage. Zechariah left Gary to take the blame – though was finally caught following his attack on Stronghold Prison, setting the record straight. Zechariah escaped with Mecha-Maid's assistance and, avoiding her trap with Gary, plotted revenge and kidnapped Chloe to mutate her into a vampiress. Zechariah was killed in the final issue, before he could succeed, when the Elder tore Zechariah's heart out of his chest and consumed it, killing him and reducing him to a skeleton in seconds – finally ending his evil actions and interference in Gary's life.
 The Actioneers – A team of superheroes who are killed and revived as vampires by Zechariah to serve him; despite retaining their memories, their instinctive loyalty to Zechariah is overpowering and follow him completely. The team was finally captured following their attack on Stronghold Prison; which they participated in beside Zechariah and Chloe, in order to track down and kill Gary. The team is kept in isolation inside GDA HQ beneath the Pentagon. In the final issue, the team, immediately following Zechariah's death, is restored to normal.
 Pamela aka "Mecha-Maid" – A member of the Actioneers superhero team; who, being a robot, was instead disassembled and kept captive by Zechariah and the now-vampiric Actioneers. Mecha-Maid finally escapes when they departed, alongside Chloe, to attack Stronghold Prison, and Mecha-Maid followed and was caught in the fray, being captured by Face and his team – but was spared at Gary's insistence and later joined him as his superhero partner (and possible love interest). Mecha-Maid later joins the expanded Guardians of the Globe and, accepting Gary's advice to let her child grow and develop on her own, constructs a robotic body for Elise. In the final issue, Mecha-Maid is seen happily reuniting with the restored Actioneers.
 Elise – The artificially-created "daughter" of Mecha-Maid; initially just a hologram, she is much later given a robotic body to live independently.
 Agent Hunter – An agent of the Global Defense Agency; who also has the ability to survive all types of injury and completely regenerate from his wounds, regardless of how fatal they are (e.g. decapitation). Hunter is placed in charge of the Wolf-Man investigation and, with his human partner and with the backing of the GDA and Guardians of the Globe, relentlessly track Gary down to arrest him, completely believing Gary murdered Rebecca, despite numerous attempts, on Gary's part, to change his mind. Hunter ultimately succeeded when Gary was caught at Rebecca's grave. Later, however, Hunter found he had been mistaken about Gary all along, and was ordered by Stedman to let go of his investigation after it was shut down. Hunter and Gary, apparently, made amends, and together join the expanded Guardians of the Globe.
 Director Cecil Stedman – The leader of the Global Defense Agency; Stedman is an enigmatic and very powerful U.S. government figure, who later becomes Gary's strongest ally following Rebecca's death, working tirelessly to aid him and later exonerate him for Zechariah's crime. Stedman later recruits Gary to the expanded Guardians of the Globe, and later gives his blessing to Gary's formation of his own team – The Wolf Corps. He is a supporting character in the Invincible series; where his history and position are further explored.
 "The Face" – A powerful criminal with two-merged faces and a third laser-blasting eye, who was in de facto control of Stronghold Prison; formerly the most powerful member of a defunct criminal organisation known as "The Body" – with Face being the last to fall and be imprisoned. Face escaped Stronghold Prison with Gary to the UK; and then released Gorgg, who betrayed Face and consumed him. Face was presumed dead, until he was found alive in Gorgg's remains during the salvation operation – immediately asking he be taken back to prison. Gary later confirmed to Construct that Face was sent back to prison as requested.
 Agent Donald Ferguson – An agent of the Global Defense Agency; who is also a robot, and later joins the expanded Guardians of the Globe. He becomes a friend to Gary and Chloe following Gary's exoneration.
 "The Elder" – An elder brood werewolf and leader of all werewolves in the world; the Elder was responsible for attacking and giving Gary his werewolf powers, making him responsible for leaving Gary's old life in ruins, and his wife and best friend dead. In the final issue, the Elder confronts Gary for battle to test his worth – explaining he had chosen Gary to succeed him as Elder of the werewolves so they may be redeemed and become great once again. After a fierce battle, Gary fatally strikes the Elder across his throat and he ultimately collapsed and bled to death – a victorious Gary stood over his body, and the surrounding werewolves immediately bowed to their new Elder.
 Jacobsen – An influential werewolf under the Elder's command; Jacobsen first met Gary while seeking to kill Zechariah to avenge his murder of one of his children – when Gary (apparently) does so, Jacobsen immediately declares he and all behind him will consider Gary an ally and friend to the werewolves. Much later, Jacobsen and the werewolves returned to attack the Hampton estate, declaring Gary was marked for death by the Elder; during which Jacobsen killed Dunford. Jacobsen was witness to the Elder and Gary's final battle, where Gary killed the Elder, as he had wished. Jacobsen and the others immediately bowed to their new Elder. Later, Jacobsen and the werewolves were taken in by Gary and, with Jacobsen's influence, forms the Wolf Corps under Gary's command – Jacobsen, embracing his humanity, deeply expressed regret for his actions at the Elder's command, but Gary, having already forgiven him, stated all issues between them were settled and all were welcome with the werewolves.
 "Gray Wolf" – A werewolf, whose real name is unknown, who is employed as an agent of the Global Defense Agency; who originally "attacked" Gary, pretending to work for the Elder, but secretly gave him a hidden communicator at Stedman's behest, as apparently Gary saved Gray Wolf's life. Later, following Gary's defeat of Gorgg, exoneration and return as a superhero, Gray Wolf joins the expanded Guardians of the Globe. After a mission to shut down Impact's former employer, Gray Wolf revealed his identity – he was the rooftop gardener who Gary, in his first night as a werewolf, apparently killed while mindlessly wandering the rooftops; explaining that, as he had terminal cancer, his new werewolf abilities, given to him by Gary who instinctively sensed his sickness, healed him of – and then Gray Wolf, a retired CIA agent, found himself back in the spy game with the GDA, as a superhero; leaving him happier than he has ever been. This revelation finally gives Gary closure on this incident (as Gray Wolf's believed death had haunted Gary for a long time afterwards). In the final issue, it is implied Gray Wolf is now the Hamptons' new butler and estate manager.

Collected editions
The series is being collected into trade paperbacks:
Volume 1 (collects The Astounding Wolf-Man #1–7, 180 pages, January 2008)
Volume 2 (collects The Astounding Wolf-Man #8–12 and Invincible #57, 160 pages, April 2009)
Volume 3 (collects The Astounding Wolf-Man #13–18, 166 pages, February 2010)
Volume 4 (collects The Astounding Wolf-Man #19–25, 160 pages, January 2011)
Astounding Wolf-Man Complete Collection hardcover (collects The Astounding Wolf-Man #1–25 and Invincible #57, July 2017,

References

External links
 
Official The Astounding Wolf-Man Website
The Astounding Wolf-Man #1: Director's Cut, Full Issue, Newsarama, December 31, 2008
Kirkman's Buy My Books Column on Comic Book Resources
Podcast interview on Astounding Wolf-Man at comiXology
Robert Kirkman: Of Wolfmen and Walking Dead, Comic Book Resources, January 16, 2009
HollywoodJesus.com Review

Image Comics male superheroes
2007 comics debuts
Comics by Robert Kirkman
Fictional characters with superhuman senses
Fictional business executives
Fictional werewolves
Image Comics characters who are shapeshifters
Image Comics characters who can move at superhuman speeds
Image Comics characters with accelerated healing
Image Comics characters with superhuman strength
Skybound Entertainment superheroes
Skybound Entertainment titles
Werewolf comics
Characters created by Robert Kirkman